Pepala vari palem is one of the villages in Chalamcharla panchayath region in Kavali mandal and Nellore district.

References

Villages in Nellore district